Hugh Galbraith Harrison (April 23, 1822 – August 12, 1891) was a real estate investor and banker who served as the second mayor of Minneapolis, Minnesota.

Life and career
Harrison was born in 1822 in Belleville, Illinois. While growing up he helped his father and older brothers who were involved in the milling business before attending college at McKendree University. In 1847 he married Irene Amelia Robinson. In 1859 he and two of his brothers relocated to Minneapolis, Minnesota where they invested in property as well as businesses including the First National Bank of St. Paul, the St. Paul & Sioux City Railroad and the Joseph Dean & Company lumber company.

In 1868 Harrison was elected as the second mayor of Minneapolis, serving from 1868 to 1869. There are few details of his term — sources note his administration was "businesslike" and "careful, capable and clean."

Harrison's wife Irene died in 1876. He remarried in 1877 to Elizabeth Wood Hunt. That same year Harrison and his brothers took their profits and organized the Security Bank, one of the early city's largest financial institutions. Harrison served as the bank's vice president from 1877 to 1887 and as president from 1887 until his death.

Harrison ran for Governor of Minnesota in the 1888 election as the Prohibition Party's candidate, but came in third place with 6.51% of the vote, losing to Republican William Rush Merriam and Democrat Eugene McLanahan Wilson.

Harrison died on August 12, 1891. He is buried at Lakewood Cemetery in Minneapolis.

Electoral history
Minneapolis Mayoral Election, 1868
Hugh Galbraith Harrison 974	
Franklin Beebe 734		
Write-Ins and Scattering 2

Notes
Most sources use "Galbraith" though his gravestone spells his middle name "Gilbraith".

References

1822 births
1891 deaths
McKendree University alumni
Mayors of Minneapolis
People from Belleville, Illinois
Burials at Lakewood Cemetery
19th-century American politicians
Minnesota Republicans
Minnesota Prohibitionists